Catalyst Game Labs (CGL) was created in May 2007 by InMediaRes Productions, LLC for the purpose of publishing print Shadowrun  and Classic BattleTech sourcebooks. In June 2007, WizKids transferred the licenses for both Shadowrun  and Classic BattleTech from FanPro's United States subsidiary, FanPro LLC, to Catalyst, and in June 2008, Catalyst announced new novels for Shadowrun and Classic BattleTech, as well as the MechWarrior series.

Most of the individuals responsible for the success of both Shadowrun and Classic BattleTech at FanPro moved to Catalyst when it acquired the licenses.

At the 2008 Gen Con, Catalyst Game Labs announced it was entering the casual gaming business (card-oriented games) with new games Paparazzi and Ooze the Cook.

Products & Properties

Role-Playing Games 
 BattleTech
 Shadowrun
 Leviathans - a miniatures wargame about lighter-than-air battleships originally due out in late 2011. (Due to production problems, the game didn't reach the street until August 22, 2012.) The game is set in an alternative version of the early 20th century.
 Cosmic Patrol - a role-playing game set in a retro future based on the Golden Age of science fiction.
 Valiant Universe - a superhero role-playing game set in the Valiant Comics fictional universe

TableTop Games 
 Dragonfire - a deckbuilder game based on Dungeons & Dragons.
 Paparazzi - a card game casting players as celebrity-hounding paparazzi, competing with each other to take the best pictures of the biggest (and most controversial) stars in Hollywood. The game was created by Adam Jury, who has worked on previous Catalyst products such as Shadowrun and Classic BattleTech.
 Ooze the Cook - a light-hearted “beer and pretzels” game where up to four players take on the roles of slimes and jellies living in a tavern, trying to grow large enough to eat the tavern’s patrons and cook. The game features several random elements meant to symbolize the Oozes’ lack of cognitive thinking. The art for the game will be provided by John Kovalic (Dork Tower, Munchkin).
 Vikings - a strategy game based on the Vikings television series, which requires the players to acquire resources and win the favor of heroes to achieve victory.
 Jarl - a tile-laying game set in the same thematic setting as Vikings. 
 Paiko - a two-player strategy game that is focused on intuitive players, with the goal being to place the most tiles on the board.
 Wrath of Dragons - a board game that has you playing as dragons over several centuries.

Rather Dashing Games 

In 2018 Loren and Heather Coleman, owners of Catalyst Game Labs, acquired Rather Dashing Games, a board game company based near Lexington, Kentucky, from Kalmbach Media. According to the Rather Dashing Games website, the company is now a division of Catalyst Game Labs.

Notes

External links
Company Web Site
Rather Dashing Games website
BattleTechWiki description of the Company
BoardGameGeek description

Role-playing game publishing companies